Domingos Spitaletti (22 November 1908 – 7 July 1986), better known as Carnera, was a Brazilian footballer. He played in three matches for the Brazil national football team in 1937. He was also part of Brazil's squad for the 1937 South American Championship.

References

External links
 
 

1908 births
1976 deaths
Brazilian footballers
Brazil international footballers
Footballers from São Paulo
Association football defenders
Sociedade Esportiva Palmeiras players
Comercial Futebol Clube (Ribeirão Preto) players